Oscar Rompani (6 August 1904 – 17 March 1974) was an Argentine rower. He competed in the men's coxed pair event at the 1964 Summer Olympics as a coxswain. At the age of 60, he is the oldest rower to have competed in the Olympics.

References

1904 births
1974 deaths
Argentine male rowers
Olympic rowers of Argentina
Rowers at the 1964 Summer Olympics
Place of birth missing
Pan American Games medalists in rowing
Pan American Games silver medalists for Argentina
Rowers at the 1959 Pan American Games
Rowers at the 1963 Pan American Games